Hell to Pay is a 2002 crime novel by George Pelecanos. It is set in Washington DC and focuses on private investigator Derek Strange and his partner Terry Quinn. It is the second novel to involve the characters and is preceded by Right as Rain (2001) and followed by Soul Circus (2003) and Hard Revolution (2004).

Plot introduction

The novel's central plotline concerns the murder by drug dealers of a no-account deadbeat over an unpaid debt and the incidental killing of the intended victim's nephew, starting with the killers’ efforts to locate the victim and continuing through Strange's investigation of the murders and the killings’ repercussions in the world of the DC drug trade. Secondary plotlines involve efforts by Strange's white associate, Terry Quinn, to locate a young girl who has disappeared into prostitution, as well as Strange's background investigation of a potentially shady young man who is engaged to marry the beautiful daughter of Strange's wealthy friend.

Explanation of the novel's title

Characters

Derek Strange is an ex-cop and current private investigator. Strange has a successful business and is a lifelong resident of Washington DC.

Major themes

The novel addresses broader themes relating to crime and the status of the African-American community in DC, frequently drawing contrasts between elements of hip-hop and gangster culture today that are portrayed as destructive, and the positive, uplifting cultural expressions of the past, such as R&B and soul music of the 1960s and 1970s. Characters also exhibit an acute awareness of gentrification, racism, and economic inequality, and these issues are the subject of comment by both the characters and the narrator, as are the history of Washington, DC and the fortunes of its various sports franchises.

Allusions and references
Hell to Pay shares many elements with the HBO original television series The Wire, on which Pelecanos has worked as a writer. For example, the (Hell to Pay) character of Granville Oliver, who fought his way out of the projects to become a high-level crime lord who never touches drugs, and whose tastefully appointed home includes an extensive black history/black power library, bears similarities to both Avon Barksdale and Stringer Bell of The Wire. Hell to Pay also contains a dog-fighting scene that seems quite similar to one depicted in the television series. Pelcanos revisits dogfighting in his later novel Drama City.

Footnotes

2002 American novels
Novels by George Pelecanos
Little, Brown and Company books
Novels set in Washington, D.C.